Rob Chiarelli (born January 13, 1963) is an American record producer, mix engineer, musician, published author and multiple Grammy Award winner. Widely recognized as a music producer for Will Smith and Men in Black II (2002), Chiarelli's work appears on numerous gold and platinum albums and motion picture soundtracks, including fourteen Grammy winners.

Early life
Chiarelli was born in Newton, Massachusetts, and raised in Waltham, Massachusetts. He started playing the drums when he was ten years old. By junior high school, he was performing in school bands and participating in the Massachusetts All-State Jazz Ensemble and the Greater Boston Youth Symphony Orchestra.  By age 17, he had received the Louis Armstrong Jazz Award (twice) and numerous awards from the International Association of Jazz Educators (formerly the National Association for Jazz Education, NAJE).  Chiarelli graduated from Waltham High School in 1981 and attended the University of Miami School of Music on a scholarship, where he studied under the direction of Don Coffman, Fred Wickstrom and Vince Maggio.  He formed his own band Inferno which recorded with producer Gary Vandy and included members Tim Mitchell (guitar), Dag Kolsrud (keyboards), Rick Margitza (sax), Mike Mangini (drums), Ed Calle (sax) and Mike Lambert (trumpet).

Career 
After moving to Los Angeles, California in 1989, Chiarelli joined Paramount Recording Studios as an assistant engineer and quickly worked his way up to a first chair recording and mix engineer. His professional breakthrough came with legendary producer Jay King while working with the Grammy-winning R&B group Club Nouveau.  Impressed with Chiarelli's work, King asked him to mix the entire Nouveau album, which reached #12 on the Billboard R&B Charts.  While working on Club Nouveau at Aire LA Studios in Glendale, California, Chiarelli met mix engineer/mentor Craig Burbidge and worked on numerous hit records from artists such as Calloway, Chuckii Booker and Teddy Pendergrass.

In 1991 Chiarelli founded Final Mix, Inc., a music production company specializing in contemporary music and artist development. Chiarelli was also CEO of Metro Beat Records, a joint venture with Semaphore Records from 1993 until 1996.  In 1997, Chiarelli formed 3.6 Records, a joint venture record label distributed by BMG/Red Ant and located in West Hollywood, CA.

In 2008, Chiarelli co-founded Gauge Precision Instruments, Inc. (originally Gauge, Inc.), a manufacturer of audio electronics and accessories for professional and consumer markets.  In 2013, Final Mix, Inc. expanded to include music software development.

Mixing and production
As a  mix engineer and record producer, Chiarelli has worked with such well known artists as
Will Smith, Christina Aguilera, LeAnn Rimes, Kirk Franklin, Mary Mary, Janet Jackson, Jermaine Jackson, Stevie Wonder, Keiko Matsui, Coolio, Ray Charles, American Idol, Pink, Johnny Mathis, Paula Abdul, Diana Ross, En Vogue, Ice Cube, The Four Tops, Yolanda Adams, The Temptations, 3LW, K-Ci & JoJo, Madonna, Aaliyah, Hilary Duff, Jesse McCartney, Ricky Martin, The Corrs, Luther Vandross, Erin Boheme, Demetrius Ross and Charlie Wilson.

His recordings have been nominated numerous times for Grammy Awards including Christina Aguilera, Will Smith, Mary Mary and Yolanda Adams.

As a musician
Chiarelli is a classically trained musician; his principal instruments include both the electric bass and orchestral percussion. As a musician his work can be heard on the recordings of Keiko Matsui, Will Smith, Hilary Duff, Waldemar Bastos, Jesse McCartney, Tatayana Ali, Teddy Pendergrass, Ray Charles, Jennifer Paige and The Corrs.

As a songwriter his work has appeared on Erin Boheme (Concord Records), Sunz of Man (BMG/SONY) and on the motion picture soundtrack of Love Stinks, a 1999 comedy starring French Stewart, Bridgette Wilson, Bill Bellamy and Tyra Banks.

Publishing
In 2009, Chiarelli's first book The Electric Bass Bible:  Volume 1 Dexterity Exercises was published by Cherry Lane Music Publishing Company, Inc., a division of Hal Leonard.

Clinician and speaker
Chiarelli has been a featured speaker & clinician at Berklee College of Music, University of Illinois, NAMM, TAXI, ASCAP, The Grammy Museum, FSU (Florida State University), MEIEA (Music and Entertainment Industry Educators Association), NXNE (North by Northeast Music Convention), Los Angeles Recording School, The International Digital Rights Foundation, Hank Shocklee's Remix Hotel, California Lawyers for the Arts, The Trebas Institute & The Sacramento Music Conference.

Societies and guilds 
 NARAS
 Audio Engineering Society
 AFM Local 47 Musicians Union
 Guitar Center Pro Advisory Board 
 Commissioner (2010-2011 Westlake Pony Baseball)
 Board of Director for The Great Leap Foundation

Selected discography 
1989: No Borders by Keiko Matsui - Engineer
1990: Wake Up by Shalamar - Mixing
1991: Night Waltz by Keiko Matsui - Engineer
1992: Cherry Blossom by Keiko Matsui - Engineer, Mixing, Programming, Drum Programming
1993: A Little More Magic by Teddy Pendergrass - Drum Programming, Engineer
1993: My World by Ray Charles - Drum Programming, Mixing, Drums
1993: Runaway Love (EP) by En Vogue - Mixing, Engineer
1993: Lethal Injection by Ice Cube - Mixing
1993: Doll by Keiko Matsui - Drum Programming, Programming
1994: The Lead and How to Swing It by Tom Jones - Mixing
1994: Mind, Body & Song by Jade - Engineer, Mixing, Remixing
1995: Do You Wanna Ride? by Adina Howard - Mixing
1995: For Lovers Only by The Temptations - Mixing
1996: 1, 2, 3, 4 (Sumpin' New) by Coolio - Mixing
1996: Dream Walk by Keiko Matsui - Drum Programming
1996: Mouse House: Disney's Dance Mixes by Disney - Programming, Arranger, Mixing, Engineer, Producer for "Colors of the Wind," "So This Is Love," and "Under the Sea"
1996: Most Requested Songs by Benny Mardones - Mixing, Drum Programming
1996: I'm Movin' On by CeCe Peniston - Mixing
1997: Waterbed Hev by Heavy D - Engineer, Mixing
1997: Greatest Hits by Ambrosia - Mixing
1997: Love Always by K-Ci & JoJo - Mixing
1997: Much Love by Shola Ama - Mixing
1997: Forever by Bobby Brown - Mixing
1997: "Men in Black"  by Will Smith - writing/arrangement
1997: Big Willie Style by Will Smith -  Mixing, Drum Programming
1998: Talk on Corners by The Corrs - Mixing
1998: The Last Shall Be First" [Clean] by Sunz of Man - Engineer, Producer, Mixing
1998: Jennifer Paige by Jennifer Paige - Drum Programming, Remixing
1998: Kiss the Sky by Tatyana Ali - Programming, Keyboards, Mixing
1998: Naked Without You by Taylor Dayne - Mixing
1998: Mi Respuesta by Laura Pausini - Mixing
1998: They Never Saw Me Coming''' by TQ - Mixing
1999: Willennium by Will Smith - Engineer, Mixing
1999: Christina Aguilera by Christina Aguilera
1999: "Ricky Martin" by Ricky Martin - Engineer
1999: Ghetto Hymns by Dave Hollister - Mixing, Engineer
1999: "It's Real" by K-Ci & JoJo - Mixing
1999: "Wild Wild West" [US CD Single]" by Will Smith - Mixing, Engineer
2000: "Aijuswanaseing" by Musiq Soulchild - Mixing
2000: "Love & Freedom" by BeBe Winans - Mixing
2000: "Remix Plus" by Christina Aguilera - Mixing
2000: "Sooner or Later" by BBMak - Mixing
2001: "Best of the Corrs" by The Corrs - Mixing, Remixing
2001: "Take You Out" by Luther Vandross - Mixing
2002: "Black Suits/Nod Ya Head" by Will Smith - Producer, Remix Producer, Mixing, Engineer
2002: "Born to Reign" by Will Smith - Producer, Engineer, Mixing, Guitar, Bass
2002: "Emotional" by K-Ci & JoJo - Mixing
2002: "From the Inside" by Laura Pausini - Mixing
2002: "Greatest Hits" by Will Smith - Producer, Remix Producer, Engineer, Mixing
2002: "Twisted Angel" by LeAnn Rimes - Mixing, Engineer
2003: "American Idol Season 2: All-Time Classic American Love Songs" by Various Artists - Mixing
2003: "Best of the Corrs/Unplugged" by The Corrs - Remixing, Mixing
2003: "Metamorphosis" by Hilary Duff - Mixing
2003: "Soulful" by Ruben Studdard - Mixing
2003: Cherry Blossom by Keiko Matsui - writing/arranging
2004: "American Idol Season 3: Greatest Soul Classics" by Various Artists - Mixing
2004: "Come Clean" by Hilary Duff - Mixing
2004: "Little Voice" by Hilary Duff - Mixing, Remixing
2004: "You Made Me" by Josh Todd - Mixing
2005: "20th Century Masters - The Christmas Collection" by The Four Tops - Engineer
2005: "Any Other Girl" by Temmora - Mixing
2005: "Live: Beautiful Soul Tour" by Jesse McCartney - Mixing
2005: "Ultimate Aaliyah" by Aaliyah - Mixing
2006: "Christina Aguilera/Stripped" by Christina Aguilera - Mixing
2006: "What Love Is" by Erin Boheme - Composer
2007: "Collaborations" by Jill Scott - Mixing
2007: "Naked Brothers Band [Bonus Tracks]" by The Naked Brothers Band - Mixing
2007: The Best of Me by  Yolanda Adams
2007: Moyo by Keiko Matsui
2008: The Sound by Mary Mary
2008: Bold Right Life by Kierra "Kiki” Sheard
2008: Best of Hilary Duff by  Hilary Duff
2008: "In the Name of Love: Africa Celebrates U2" by Various Artists - Mixing
2009: "Skinny Jeanz and a Mic" by New Boyz - Mixing
2009: "We Can Work It Out"
2010: "Big Time Rush" by Big Time Rush - Vocal Engineer, Mixing
2010: "Charice" by Charice - Mixing
2010: "Just Charlie" by Charlie Wilson - Mixing
2010: Too Cool To Care by  New Boyz
2010: The Road by Keiko Matsui
2010: Kinanda by Stella Mwangi
2011: Hello Fear by Kirk Franklin - Mixing
2011: HurtLoveBox by Mark Ballas - Producer, Engineer, Mixing
2011: "Stereo Typical" by Rizzle Kicks - Mixing
2011: Something Big by Mary Mary
2011: Shine On! Volume One 
2011: "American Idol: 10th Anniversary: The Hits, Vol. 1" by Various Artists - Mixing
2011: "Road..." by Keiko Matsui - Mixing, Engineer
2011: "Too Cool to Care" by New Boyz - Guitar (Bass), Pro-Tools, Mixing, Producer
2011: Stereo Typical by Rizzle Kicks - Mixing
2012: "Chasing Tigers" by Mim Grey - Mixing
2012: "Classics of My Soul" by Waldemar Bastos - Mixing
2012: "FYI" by Stefanie Scott -  Producer 
2012: "Go Get It" by Mary Mary - Mixing
2012: "Michael Lynche" by Michael Lynche - Composer, Engineer, Instrumentation, Mixing, Producer
2013: "Love, Charlie" by Charlie Wilson - Mixing
2013: "Roaring 20s" by Rizzle Kicks - Mixing
2013: "The Best Man" by Holiday - Mixing
2013: "Roaring 20s" by Rizzle Kicks - Mixing
2014: "Jazz Funk & Soul by Lorber Loeb & Hart" - Mixing
2014: "Foreign Land by 3 Winans Brothers" Winans family - Mixing
2014: Unconditional Love by Ruben Studdard - Mixing
2014: Chicago Winds...The Saga Continues by Dave Hollister - Mixing, Engineer
2014: "Game Changer" by Johnny Gill - Mixing
2014: "Fast Forward" by The Walls Group - Mixing
2014: "Help" by Erica Campbell (musician) - Mixing
2015: "Say Hep Hep by Dessy Di Lauro" - Mixing
2015: "Summer Time Feeling (Single)" by Jermaine Jackson - Mixing
2015: Life Music: Stage Two by Jonathan McReynolds - Mixing
2015: Losing My Religion by Kirk Franklin - Mixing
2015: Help 2.0 by Erica Campbell (musician) - Mixing

Soundtracks
1992: "Menace II Society" - Original soundtrack - Engineer, Mixing
1992: "Deep Cover" - Original soundtrack - Engineer, Mixing
1994: "Above the Rim" - Original soundtrack - Mixing, Mixing Engineer
1994: "Street Fighter" - Original soundtrack - Engineer
1994: "Mi Vida Loca" - Original soundtrack - Mixing
1996: "Sunset Park" - Original soundtrack - Mixing
1999: "Love Stinks" - Original soundtrack - Producer
2000: "Love & Basketball" - Original soundtrack - Mixing
2002: "All About the Benjamins" - Original soundtrack - Mixing
2002: "Men in Black II" - Original Motion Picture Soundtrack - Mixing, Producer
2002: American Idol (season 1)2003: American Idol (season 2)2004: "Cinderella Story" - Original soundtrack - Mixing
2006: "MTV Presents Laguna Beach: Summer Can Last Forever" - Original soundtrack - Mixing
2011: "American Idol: 10th Anniversary: The Hits, Vol. 1" by Various Artists - Mixing
2011: "The Best Man (Motion Picture)" by Holiday - Mixing

Grammy Awards

Publishing historyThe Electric Bass Bible:  Volume 1 Dexterity Exercises'' (2009)

References

Further reading
Taxi: Interview with Rob Chiarelli
LaunchMondays: Interview with Rob Chiarelli (March 2010)

External links

Rob Chiarelli on Twitter
Rob Chiarelli on Discogs

1963 births
Living people
Record producers from Massachusetts
Record producers from California
People from Waltham, Massachusetts
Guitarists from Massachusetts
Guitarists from California
20th-century American drummers
American male drummers
20th-century American guitarists
American male guitarists
20th-century American male musicians
Waltham High School alumni